"Don't Forget Your Roots" is a single by New Zealand rock band Six60. It was released as on 18 July 2011 as the second single from their self-titled debut studio album. It reached number 2 on the New Zealand Singles Chart.

In September 2019, Six60 re-recorded the song for Waiata / Anthems, a collection of re-recorded New Zealand pop songs to promote te Wiki o te Reo Māori (Māori Language Week). The new version, retitled "Kia Mau Ki Tō Ūkaipō / Don't Forget Your Roots", featured lyrics reinterpreted by scholar Tīmoti Kāretu as is featured on the album, Waiata / Anthems.

Music video
A music video to accompany the release of "Don't Forget Your Roots" was first released onto YouTube on 13 July 2011 at a total length of three minutes and forty-eight seconds. it was written as a remix version of "Dont Forget Your Roots"

Track listing
 Digital single
 "Don't Forget Your Roots" – 3:53
 "Don't Forget Your Roots" (Crushington Remix) – 3:41
 "Don't Forget Your Roots" (Damn Moroda remix) – 3:58

Chart performance
"Don't Forget Your Roots" debuted on the RIANZ charts at number 10 and has peaked to number 2.

Charts

Year-end charts

Release history

References

2011 singles
Six60 songs
Number-one singles in New Zealand
2011 songs